{{DISPLAYTITLE:C20H28N4O2}}
The molecular formula C20H28N4O2 may refer to:

 AB-CHMINACA, an indazole-based synthetic cannabinoid
 Rolofylline, an experimental diuretic which acts as a selective adenosine A1 receptor antagonist

Molecular formulas